Edwin 'Percy' Baker (1895–1990), was a lawn and indoor bowler. Throughout his career he was known as Percy Baker.

Baker was regarded as the greatest English bowler until his records were broken by David Bryant.

Born at Weston-Super-Mare in Somerset he was a photographer by trade but was persuaded to take up bowling in 1921. He joined the Poole Park Bowling Club and was to win their club singles 22 times. He won 11 county singles over a 37-year period and led Dorset in the Middleton Cup from 1927 until 1969.

He won four English National Singles titles in 1932, 1946, 1952 & 1955, setting a record at the time. He also won two pairs (1950 & 1962) and a triples (1960) at the National Bowls Championships.

Capped by England in 1933, it was not until 1949 that he established his place and captained England from 1950. After suffering a serious illness he recovered in time to represent England in the 1958 British Empire and Commonwealth Games where he won a silver medal in the singles.

Baker won the Bournemouth Open pairs at the age of 76 in 1971 before retiring because he was suffering from poor vision. He died in a Poole hospital on 3 January 1990 aged 94. His son Cecil Baker also played lawn bowls representing the Ryde club at the Nationals.

References 

English male bowls players
1895 births
1990 deaths
Commonwealth Games medallists in lawn bowls
Commonwealth Games silver medallists for England
Bowls players at the 1958 British Empire and Commonwealth Games
Medallists at the 1958 British Empire and Commonwealth Games